, based in Tokyo, Japan, is a talent agency whose CEO is Hiroshi Fujita (藤田博士).

This firm was spun off from the tarento and model division of its parent company Face Network Co., Ltd on 1 April 2008.

Affiliated people

Male Talents 
 Hiroki Hoshino (星野広樹)
 Takuya Yamato (大和啄也)

Female Talents 
 Saori Horii
 Fifi (フィフィ)
 Nao Kudo (工藤菜緒)
 Kanae Miyauchi (宮内加奈恵)
 Natsumi Mizuno (水野夏美)
 Tomoko Shimokawa (下川友子)
 Rika Takeshita (竹下莉香)
 Hana Tojima (戸島花)
 Nonoka Yamazaki (山崎野乃華)

Fashion Models 
 Alina (Alina)
 Chikage (千景)
 Setsu Katagiri (片桐セツ)
 Keito (恵都)
 Kewen (Kewen)
 Kiera (Kiera)
 Arisa Niikura (新倉有沙)
 Naomi Watanabe (渡辺奈緒美)
 Atsuko Yamakawa (山川敦子)

Junior Talents 
 Sae Abe (阿部紗英)
 Raima Hiramatsu (平松來馬)
 Maria Hirooka (廣岡まりあ)
 Rina Jouzaki (城崎里奈)
 Mayuka Kuroda (黒田真友香)
 Nanase Matsushima (松嶋七星)
 Natsuki Ohta (太田菜月)
 Reira Suguro (勝呂玲羅)
 Yuu Yoshiki (吉識優)

Formerly Belonged 
 Bobby Ologun
 Hidemi Hikita (疋田英美) - until March 2010
 Yumi Kobayashi - until March 2010
 Mao Mizoguchi - until March 2010
 Miu Yamaguchi (山口美羽) - until July 2008

External links 
 PLATICA Inc. 
 Company Overview 

Talent agencies based in Tokyo
Business services companies established in 2008
Japanese talent agencies
Japanese companies established in 2008